Eagle Eye Networks, Inc. is an American company providing cloud-based video surveillance products
for physical security and business operations applications.

History
Eagle Eye Networks was founded in 2012 by Dean Drako, Barracuda Networks' founder and former CEO. Drako said he started Eagle Eye Networks as a result of his frustrations with trying to deploy and use existing video surveillance systems for remote management while he was CEO of Barracuda.

The company and its first product, the Eagle Eye Cloud Security Camera Video Management System, were first publicly announced in January 2014. The company announced its channel partner program the following month.

Eagle Eye Networks announced a multimillion-dollar series B venture round investment in July 2014, which included an investment by Michael Dell's private family venture fund, MSD Capital. Michael Dell stated that he made the investment primarily because of CEO Dean Drako's prior success with Barracuda Networks. Enrique Salem, prior CEO of Symantec and Austin Ventures also invested in the round.

The company announced that it added a new data center in Austin, Texas in September 2014.

In February 2015, Diebold, financial self-service, security and services corporation, and Eagle Eye Networks announced an alliance to deliver cloud-based video services, which would stream and store live and recorded video, generate notifications and support real-time analytics. According to Diebold, Eagle Eye Networks had developed the industry's first cloud-based video solution with an open API.

Dean Drako, Eagle Eye Networks' CEO, wholly acquired Brivo cloud access control company for $50 million in June 2015. Drako said he saw the opportunity to accelerate the cloud technology shift underway in the physical security industry by integrating Brivo's cloud access control with Eagle Eye Networks' cloud video surveillance. The two companies will continue to operate as separate entities.

In April 2017, Eagle Eye Networks and Swift Sensors announced a major partnership  to deliver cloud-based wireless sensor and video surveillance for applications across multiple industries., enabling users to check video as needed, based on sensor data.

In 2020, Eagle Eye Networks raised $40 million in Series E funding from Accel for a total of $100 million since the company was founded in 2012.  The company said it planned to use the funding to further develop artificial intelligence (AI) analytics on its cloud-based video surveillance platform, and to continue its growth.

Products
Eagle Eye Cloud Security Camera Video Management System is a cloud-managed video surveillance system that links analog and IP cameras with an on-site bridge or cloud managed video recorder appliance which transmit the encrypted video recording to Eagle Eye's cloud data center.

The system supports mobile apps for system installation, remote video viewing, and system management, with alerts for motion detection, system tampering and camera malfunction. It also handles bandwidth management, and supports user adjustment of how much video is stored in the cloud or on-premises.

The Eagle Eye Video API is an open RESTful API for integrators and developers to integrate video into their applications. It provides a set of storage, analytics, indexing, and interfaces for building or integrating applications with both live and recorded video.

The company's AI Video Search utilizes artificial intelligence to enable searches for people and objects across all security cameras; the customer types in the description and then narrow results by date, time, location, and camera.

Recognition

Eagle Eye Networks' initial company launch was discussed by many publications, including MarketWatch, Computerworld, and The Wall Street Journal, for the company's focus on simple design and ease of use.

Its cloud-based security camera system received an award for the best new hosted solution from the Security Industry Association in April 2014. The company was listed as a CRN Magazine top 25 emerging company in July 2014.

Eagle Eye's founder and Dean Drako was named to Goldman Sachs' 100 most intriguing entrepreneurs list for 2014.

In November 2019, the Deloitte Technology Fast 500 ranked Eagle Eye Networks #133 of the fastest growing technology companies in North America, with 936% growth from 2015 to 2018.

In November 2020, Eagle Eye Networks made the Deloitte Technology Fast 500 list of fastest-growing technology companies in North America for the second year in a row. The company ranked #187, with 652% growth from 2016 to 2019.

Acquisitions

Timeline

External links

References

Companies based in Austin, Texas
Electronics companies of the United States
Video surveillance companies